The W. Alden Spencer Award is awarded to an investigator in recognition of outstanding research contributions by the College of Physicians and Surgeons, the Department of Neuroscience, and The Kavli Institute for Brain Science at Columbia University. It is named after W. Alden Spencer, a Professor of Physiology and Neurology at Columbia University. The award winner also gives a lecture. In 2018, it took place at on October 9, 2018.

Recipients
 1978 Emilio Bizzi
 1979 Charles F. Stevens
 1980 John Heuser, Thomas Reese
 1981 Gerald Fischbach
 1982 Patricia Goldman-Rakic
 1983 Erwin Neher, Bert Sakmann
 1984 Paul H. Patterson
 1985 A.J. Hudspeth
 1986 H. Robert Horvitz, John Sulston
 1987 Robert H. Wurtz
 1988 Lily Yeh Jan, Yuh Nung Jan
 1989 Holger Wigstrom, Bengt Gustafsson, Roger Nicoll
 1990 Michael P. Stryker 
 1991 Roger Y. Tsien
 1992 Corey S. Goodman
 1993 Richard H. Scheller, Thomas C. Südhof
 1994 Richard A. Andersen, William T. Newsome III
 1995 Richard W. Aldrich, Christopher Miller
 1996 Carla Shatz
 1997 Cornelia Bargmann
 1998 Roderick MacKinnon
 1999 David Anderson
 2000 Joshua Sanes
 2001 Joseph Takahashi
 2002 Eric Knudsen, Charles Gilbert
 2003 Huda Zoghbi
 2004 Thomas R. Insel, Emmanuel Mignot
 2005 Edvard Moser, May-Britt Moser
 2006 Winfried Denk, David W. Tank
 2007 David Julius, Charles G. Zuker
 2008 Nikos K. Logothetis
 2009  Michael N. Shadlen
 2010 S. Lawrence Zipursky, Marc Tessier-Lavigne
 2011 Karl Deisseroth
 2012 Allison J. Doupe, Michael S. Brainard
 2013 Eric Gouaux
 2015 Atsushi Miyawaki, Loren L. Looger
 2016 Winrich Freiwald, Doris Y. Tsao
 2017 Ardem Patapoutian, David Ginty
 2018 Silvia Arber and Botond Roska

See also 
 The Kavli Prize
 The Brain Prize
 Gruber Prize in Neuroscience
 Karl Spencer Lashley Award
 The Mind & Brain Prize
 Perl-UNC Prize
 Ralph W. Gerard Prize in Neuroscience
 List of neuroscience awards

References

External links
Website
Awards established in 1978
Neuroscience awards
1978 establishments in the United States
Awards and prizes of Columbia University